Yehiel Tzagai (born 27 January 1983) is an Ethiopian-born Israeli footballer.

Biography
Tzagai was born in the Beta Israel community in Ethiopia and his family immigrated to Israel in 1991 during the Operation Solomon.

Tzagai grew up through the ranks at Beitar Avraham Be'er Sheva but as the club has collapsed in 2002, he signed at another club in Beersheba - Hapoel Be'er Sheva where he was loaned until 2004 to F.C. Ashdod and Hakoah Ramat Gan.

In 2004 Tzagai returned to Hapoel Be'er Sheva and played there for three seasons in the second league, where he was considered one of the most talented players in the whole league. During the 2006-07 season, Tzagai and two other Be'er Sheva players admitted to receiving bribes to throw a match against Hapoel Ra'anana. However, all three players had refused to throw the match, and later received threats from the people who had attempted to bribe them.

In July 2007 Tzagai signed for Maccabi Netanya and had a very successful debut season with 4 goals and 6 assists, but after some problems with Lothar Matthäus he decided to leave the club and in the end of September 2008 he signed with Bnei Sakhnin.

In September 2009 after one poor season with Sakhnin, Tzagai signed for Hapoel Ashkelon. He scored 13 goals and made 7 assists and was voted as the MVP of the 2009-10 season in Liga Leumit after he was the main reason Ashkelon got promoted to the Israeli Premier League.

On 23 May 2010 it was reported that Tzagai signed a 2-year contract with APOP Kinyras Peyias

He returned to Hapoel Be'er Sheva on 10 January 2011.

In May 2011 he signed a 2 years contract with Sektzia Ness Ziona in the Liga Leumit. The next season, he returned to play for Hapoel Ashkelon, there he played for 3 seasons.

In the 2015-16 season he signed for Maccabi Jaffa in Liga Alef.

Honours
Liga Leumit:
Runner-up (1): 2009-10
Player of the Year (2): 2009-10, 2011–12

References

1983 births
Living people
Ethiopian Jews
Ethiopian emigrants to Israel
Citizens of Israel through Law of Return
Israeli Jews
Israeli footballers
Association football midfielders
Beitar Be'er Sheva F.C. players
Hapoel Be'er Sheva F.C. players
Bnei Sakhnin F.C. players
Maccabi Netanya F.C. players
F.C. Ashdod players
Hakoah Maccabi Amidar Ramat Gan F.C. players
Sektzia Ness Ziona F.C. players
Hapoel Ashkelon F.C. players
Maccabi Jaffa F.C. players
Hapoel Azor F.C. players
Bnei Jaffa F.C. players
Hapoel Ironi Baqa al-Gharbiyye F.C. players
Hapoel Beit She'an F.C. players
Liga Leumit players
Israeli Premier League players
Cypriot First Division players
Israeli people of Ethiopian-Jewish descent
Sportspeople of Ethiopian descent
APOP Kinyras FC players
Expatriate footballers in Cyprus
Israeli expatriate sportspeople in Cyprus
Footballers from Beersheba